Creatures of the Night: The Rocky Horror Experience is a book about the cult following of the motion picture The Rocky Horror Picture Show, written by Sal Piro.

Piro was President of the National Fan club since 1977. The book contains information about the beginnings of the cult following as well as Piro's own experiences as a fan of the film.

References

Works about fandom
Popular culture books
Rocky Horror
1990 non-fiction books
Books about film
English-language books